This is a list of the first women lawyer(s) and judge(s) in Alabama. It includes the year in which the women were admitted to practice law (in parentheses). Also included are women who achieved other distinctions such becoming the first in their state to graduate from law school or become a political figure.

Firsts in Alabama's history

Law School
 First female law graduates: Floella T. Bonner and Virginia Henry Mayfield in 1920

Lawyers 

 First female: Maud McLure Kelly (1908) 
 First African American female: Mahala Ashley Dickerson (1948)

State judges 

 First female: Virginia Henry Mayfield in 1923 
 First African American female: Faya Ora Rose Touré 
First female (Alabama Court of Appeals): Annie Lola Price (1928) in 1951 
First female (Supreme Court of Alabama): Janie Shores (1959) in 1974 
 First elected female (trial judge): Phyllis S. Nesbit in 1976
 First female (probate judge): Earlean Isaac in 1989 

First female (district court judge): Sharon Lovelace Blackburn in 1991 
First female (Southern District of Alabama): Callie "Ginny" V. Granade (1975) in 2002 
First female chief justice (Supreme Court of Alabama): Sue Bell Cobb (1981) in 2006 
 First (African American) female (elected state judge): Deborah Biggers (1975) in 2014
 First female (presiding judge): Elisabeth French in 2020

Attorney General of Alabama  

 First female (acting): Alice Martin (1981) in 2017

United States Attorney 

First female (Northern District of Alabama): Alice Martin (1981) in 2001

Assistant United States Attorney 

 First female (Southern District of Alabama): Callie "Ginny" V. Granade (1975) from 1977-2011

District Attorneys 

 First female: Janice Clardy in 1985 
First African American female: Lynneice Washington (1996) in 2017

Assistant District Attorney 

 First female: Judith "Judy" Crittenden (1970)

Political Office 

First females elected to U.S. House of Representatives from Alabama: Terri Sewell (1994) and Martha Roby (c. 2001) in 2010 
First female elected to U.S. Senate from Alabama: Katie Britt in 2022

Alabama State Bar Association 

 First African American female (admitted to state bar): Estelle Henderson (1919)
 First female president: Alyce Manley in 2010

Firsts in local history
 Martha Lynn Sherrod: First African American female judge to win a partisan election in North Alabama

 Inge Prytz Johnson (1973): First female to serve on the 31st Judicial Circuit Court of Alabama (1978)
 Shannon Clark: First female serve as a Judge of the Twelfth District in Alabama (2011)
 Kimberly Clark (1996): First female serve as a Judge of the Thirty-Third Judicial Circuit in Alabama (2015)

 Janice Clardy: First female to serve as a District Attorney in the Nineteenth Judicial Circuit of Alabama (1985) [Autauga, Chilton and Elmore Counties, Alabama]

 Phyllis S. Nesbit: First female to serve on the Baldwin County District Court (1976). She was also the first female President of the Baldwin County Bar Association, Alabama (1966-1967).
 Sherry Burns: First female judge in Blount County, Alabama (2010)
 Shannon Clark: First female circuit court judge for Coffee and Pike Counties, Alabama (2011)
 Sue Bell Cobb (1981): First female judge in Conecuh County, Alabama
 Eugenia Lee Loggins (1978): First female lawyer in the city of Opp and Covington County, Alabama
 Juliet St. John Given (1976): First female lawyer in Cullman County, Alabama
 Kimberly Clark: First female circuit court judge in Dale and Geneva Counties, Alabama (2015)
 Earlean Isaac: First African American female to serve on the Greene County Probate Court in Alabama (1989)
 Lori Collier Ingram: First female district court judge in Houston County, Alabama (2009)
 Deborah Dunsmore: First female municipal court judge in Scottsboro, Alabama (2022) [Jackson County, Alabama]
 Nina Miglionico: First female (a lawyer) to become a member of the Birmingham City Council (1963) [Jefferson County, Alabama]
 Judith "Judy" Crittenden (1970): First female to become an Assistant District Attorney in Jefferson County, Alabama
 Agnes Chappell (1977): First African American female lawyer in Jefferson County, Alabama. She would later become a judge.
 Helen Shores Lee (1987): First African American female to serve on the Civil Division of the Circuit Court of Jefferson County (2003)
 Kira Fonteneau: First (African American) female to head the then newly created Jefferson County Public Defender Office (2012)
 Lynneice Washington (1996): First female (and African American female) District Attorney in Jefferson County, Alabama (2017)
 Elisabeth French: First female to serve as the Presiding Judge of the Jefferson County Court in Alabama (2020)
 Deborah Bell Paseur (1977): First female lawyer in Lauderdale County, Alabama. She would later become a judge.
 Angie Hamilton: First female to serve as an Assistant District Attorney for Lauderdale County, Alabama (2017)
 Angela Dawson Terry (1998): First female district judge in Lawrence County, Alabama
 Linda W.H. Henderson: First female to become President of the Macon County Bar Association (2000-2003, et al.)
 Martha Lynn Sherrod: First African American (female) to serve as the Assistant District Attorney and a Presiding Municipal and District Court Judge in Madison County, Alabama
 Andrea LeCroy: First female probate judge in Marshall County, Alabama
 Frankie Fields Smith: First African American female to serve as a Municipal Court Judge in Mobile County, Alabama (1975)
 Ashley Rich: First female District Attorney of Mobile County, Alabama (2010)
 Eldora Anderson: First African American female (and African American in general) probate judge in Perry County, Alabama (2006)
 Amy Newsome: First female district court judge in Randolph County, Alabama (2018)
 Brandi Williams: First female municipal court judge in St. Clair County, Alabama (2018)
 Patricia M. Smith: First female judge in Shelby County, Alabama
 Jill Lee: First female to become District Attorney for Shelby County, Alabama (2014)
 Virginia H. Mayfield: First female judge in Tuscaloosa County, Alabama (1923)
 Jane Kimbrough Dishuck (1947): First female lawyer in Tuscaloosa County, Alabama
 Mabey Yerby Lawson: First female to graduate from the University of Alabama law school [Tuscaloosa County, Alabama]
 Briana Westry-Robinson: First African-American female to serve as the youngest judge in Wilcox County, Alabama (2017)

See also 

 List of first women lawyers and judges in the United States [Nationwide]
 Timeline of women lawyers in the United States
 Women in law

Other topics of interest 

List of first minority male lawyers and judges in the United States
List of first minority male lawyers and judges in Alabama

References 

Lawyers, Alabama, first
Alabama, first
Alabama, first
Women, Alabama, first
Women, Alabama, first
Women in Alabama
Alabama lawyers
Lists of people from Alabama